The Semi-Italian Opening (also known as Half Giuoco Piano, Lesser Giuoco Piano, and Paris Defence) is one of Black's responses to the Italian Game. It begins with the moves:
1. e4 e5
2. Nf3 Nc6
3. Bc4 d6

Black's intent is to play a Hungarian Defense with an early ...Bg4, fighting for control of the d4-square. The line was tried by Alexander Alekhine early in his career. The first recorded use in international competition was in 1846. I. A. Horowitz called the defence "solid", also writing: "It does not seem quite sufficient for equality."

The Encyclopaedia of Chess Openings code for the Semi-Italian is C50.

Lines

Main line: 4.c3 
 4...Bg4 5.d4 Qe7 6.Be3 Nf6 7.Qb3 Nd8 8.Nbd2 g6 9.dxe5 and White was slightly better in Grigory Levenfish–Alexander Tolush, Leningrad 1939.
 4...Qe7 5.d4 g6 or 5.0-0 g6 is satisfactory for Black (Alekhine).
 4...Be6 is preferred by Savielly Tartakower.

4.d4 Bg4
After 4...exd4 5.Nxd4 Nf6 6.Nc3 White has the freer game according to Paul Keres, and instead of 5...Nf6, Larry Evans has suggested 5...g6 The move 4...Be7 transposes to the Hungarian Defense. 
5. c3 and now:
 5...Qd7 and White has some  after either 6.d5 or 6.Bb5 (Keres), or 6.Be3 (Evans).      
 5...Nf6 6.Qb3 with a clear advantage for White (Keres).
 5...Qf6 6.Be3 Bxf3 7.Qxf3 with some advantage for White (Keres).
 5...Qe7 transposes to the Main line. 
5. h3 and White is slightly better, for example 5... Bxf3 6. Qxf3 and now:
 6...Nf6 7.d5 (Wolfgang Unzicker). 
 6...Qf6 7.Qb3 Nd8 8.dxe5 dxe5 9.Be3 Bd6 10.Nc3 Ne7 11.Nb5 a6 12.Nxd6 Qxd6 13.0-0 Qc6 14.f4! and White had the attack in  Viktor Gavrikov–Evgeny Vladimirov, USSR 1978 (Unzicker).

4.h3
White prevents Black's thematic ...Bg4. The reply 4.h3 leads to lines similar to the Hungarian Defense, for example 4... Be7 5. d4 and now:
 5...Nf6 6.d5 Nb8 7.Bd3 0-0 8.Be3 a5 9.g4!? (Keres preferred 9.c4) Na6 10.Qd2 c6 11.c4 Nd7 12.Nc3 Ndc5 leading to a  game with balanced chances in Viktor Kupreichik–Podgayets, USSR 1970. 
 5...Nxd4 6.Nxd4 exd4 7.Qh5 g6 8.Qd5 Be6 9.Qxb7 Nf6 10.Bxe6 fxe6 11.Qc6+ Kf7 12.Nd2 Qd7 13.Qc4 c5 14.0-0 d5 (Gyula Sax–Borislav Ivkov, Amsterdam 1976) with an even game (Unzicker).

4.Nc3
This transposes to the game Maslov–Anatoly Lutikov, USSR 1963, which continued 4...Bg4 5.h3 Bxf3 6.Qxf3 Nf6 7.Ne2 (or 7.d3) and White stands slightly better (Keres, Miroslav Filip).

Notable games

Rodzinski vs. Alekhine, Paris 1913:

1. e4 e5 2. Nf3 Nc6 3. Bc4 d6 4. c3 Bg4 5. Qb3 
5.d4, the Main line, is better.
 
5... Qd7 6. Ng5 
6.Bxf7+ Qxf7 7.Qxb7 Kd7 8.Qxa8 Bxf3 9.gxf3 Qxf3 10.Rg1 Qxe4+ 11.Kd1 Qf3+ 12.Ke1 Qe4+ with perpetual check (Alekhine); or 12...e4 13.Na3 Ne5 14.Qxa7 Nd3+ 15.Kf1 with an even game according to Veniamin Sozin, but Black  with 15...Qd1+ 16.Kg2 Nf4+ 17.Kg3 Qf3+ 18.Kh4 Qh3+ 19.Kg5 Ne6.

6... Nh6 7. Nxf7 Nxf7 8. Bxf7+ Qxf7 9. Qxb7 Kd7 10. Qxa8 Qc4 11. f3 (diagram) Bxf3 12. gxf3 Nd4 13. d3 
13.cxd4 Qxc1+ with clear advantage for Black.
 
13... Qxd3 14. cxd4 Be7 15. Qxh8 Bh4#

See also
 List of chess openings
 List of chess openings named after places
 Philidor Defence

References

Bibliography

Chess openings